The Didarganj Yakshi (or Didarganj Chauri Bearer) is one of the finest examples of very early Indian stone statues.  It used to be dated to the 3rd century BCE, as it has the fine Mauryan polish associated with Mauryan art.  But this is also found on later sculptures and it is now usually dated to approximately the 2nd century CE, based on the analysis of shape and ornamentation, or the 1st century CE. The treatment of the forelock in particular is said to be characteristically Kushan.

The sculpture is now in the Bihar Museum in Patna, Bihar, India, close to where it was found in 1917. Patna, as Pataliputra, was also the Mauryan capital.

The statue is 5'2” tall on a pedestal of 1'7 ½” made of Chunar sandstone finished to an incredible mirror-like polish.  The life-size standing image is a tall, well-proportioned, free-standing sculpture made of sandstone with the well-polished surface associated with Mauryan polish, although this persisted for some time after the empire fell. The fly-whisk (chauri) is held in the right hand whereas the left hand is broken. The lower garment creates a somewhat transparent effect.  Like many of the earliest large sculptures in Indian art, it represents a minor spiritual figure or deity, a yakshi, rather than one of the major deities.

Context and style
Female yakshi or yakshini, and male yaksha, are very minor figures, on the borders of deity. Yakshi are often local spirits of water and trees.  They are figures from Indian folk religion who were accepted into the pantheons of Buddhism, Hinduism and Jainism. In the earliest surviving Indian stone monumental sculptures, they, or at least figures identified by modern art historians as them, are very common subjects, preceding those of more significant deity figures.  The Buddhist stupa sites of Sanchi and Bharhut both have many, those at Bharhut carrying inscriptions with their names.

The figure has the elements that would continue to be expected in female Indian religious statues "an elaborate headdress and jewellery, heavy spherical breasts, narrow waist, ample hips and a graceful posture ... [with] only sketchy attempts to portray such details of physical anatomy as musculature; rather it is a quality of inwardly held breath that is conveyed. This breath (prana) is identified with the essence of life...". For another scholar, the statue shows "for the first time the sculptural realization of a full and volumptuous form with a definite sense of its organic articulation". In contrast to the front, the "figure is flattened at the back with only a perfunctory indication of modelling".

Modern history
The Didarganj Yakshi was excavated on the banks of the Ganges River, at the hamlet of Didarganj Kadam Rasual, northeast of the Qadam-i-Rasul Mosque in Patna City, on 18 October 1917 by the villagers and by the noted archaeologist and historian, Professor J N Samaddar Professor Samaddar, with the help of the then president of Patna Museum Committee and member of Board of Revenue, Mr. E. H. C. Walsh and Dr. D. B. Spooner, the noted archaeologist, retrieved the figure in Patna Museum, Patna.

The statue's nose was damaged during a travelling exhibition, The Festival of India, en route to Smithsonian Institution and the National Gallery of Art, Washington, D.C., leading to a decision not to send it abroad again.

To celebrate the centenary year of the excavation, Sunita Bharti, a theatre director from Patna, produced and directed a play, Yakshini, in 2017. It was staged by the Indian Council for Cultural Relations (ICCR, Govt. of India) and the Indira Gandhi National Centre for the Arts (IGNCA, Govt. of India), New Delhi.

Notes

References
Harle, J.C., The Art and Architecture of the Indian Subcontinent, 2nd edn. 1994, Yale University Press Pelican History of Art, 
Michell, George (1977), The Hindu Temple: An Introduction to its Meaning and Forms, 1977, University of Chicago Press, 
Rowland, Benjamin, The Art and Architecture of India: Buddhist, Hindu, Jain, 1967 (3rd edn.), Pelican History of Art, Penguin,

External links
 Didarganj Yakshi at Patna Museum
 Didarganj Yakshi
Didargnaj Yakshini: Depiction of Complete Womanhood (Hindi)



Sculptures from Bihar
Statues in Bihar
Tourist attractions in Patna
Mauryan art
Stone sculptures
Yakshas